Supernatural is the second album by Stereo MC's, released in 1990. The US release is subtitled "American Mix" and has a different track list. In 1996, Mixmag ranked the album at number 46 in its list of the "Best Dance Albums of All Time".

Track listing
All songs written by Robert Birch (Rob B)/Nicholas Hallam (The Head), except as noted
 "I'm a Believer" (4:35)
 "Scene of the Crime" (4:04)
 "Declaration" (3:08)
 "Elevate My Mind" (3:24)
 "What'cha Gonna Do" (R. Birch/N. Hallam/P. Hall) (3:55)
 "Two Horse Town" (5:10)
 "Ain't Got Nobody" (4:43)
 "Goin' Back to the Wild" (R. Birch/N. Hallam/P. Hall) (4:31)
 "Lost in Music" (4:34)
 "Life on the Line" (3:57)
 "The Other Side" (4:42)
 "Set Me Loose" (3:29)
 "What's the Word" (3:39)
 "Early One Morning" (3:45)
 "Smokin' with the Motherman" (7:50)
 "Relentless" (4:44)

American Mix
 "I'm a Believer" (4:35)
 "Scene of the Crime" (4:04)
 "Declaration" (2:55)
 "Elevate My Mind" (3:19)
 "Two Horse Town" (5:11)
 "Ain't Got Nobody" (4:38)
 "Goin' Back to the Wild" (Birch, Hallam, Hall) (4:31)
 "Lost in Music" (Ultimatum Remix) (4:34)
 "The Other Side" (4:42)
 "Set Me Loose" (3:29)
 "What's the Word" (3:39)
 "Early One Morning" (3:43)

Notes

Cover art by 
Sean Phillips

References

1990 albums
Stereo MCs albums
Island Records albums